Olympiacos Men's Waterpolo, commonly referred to as Olympiacos, Olympiacos Piraeus or with its full name as Olympiacos CFP,  is the men's water polo department of the major Greek multi-sport club, Olympiacos CFP, based in Piraeus, Greece. The department was founded in 1925, one of the founding members of the Hellenic Swimming Federation, and their home ground is the Papastrateio Pool in Piraeus.

Olympiacos is one of the most successful teams in Europe and a traditional powerhouse of continental water polo, having won 2 LEN Champions Leagues (2001–02, 2017–18), 1 LEN Super Cup (2002) and 2 Triple Crowns (2002, 2018), the only Greek club to have been crowned European Champions. They have also been six times runners-up (counting nine European finals overall), three in the LEN Champions League (2000–01, 2015–16, 2018–19), two in the LEN Cup Winners' Cup (1997–98, 1998–99) and one more in the LEN Super Cup (2018). In 2001–02, Olympiacos became the first club ever in waterpolo history to win all four competitions they claimed (LEN Champions League, LEN Super Cup, Greek League and Greek Cup), completing a Continental Quadruple. They won their second Continental Quadruple in 2017–18 season (LEN Champions League, Greek League, Greek Cup, Greek Super Cup). After the 2014–15 LEN Euro League win of the women's department, parent club Olympiacos CFP became the second sports club in continental waterpolo history to have been crowned European Champions with both its men's and women's teams and the only one in Europe with both these departments currently active.

Domestically, Olympiacos is the most titled club in Greek water polo history, as the club's 64 domestic titles (67 overall) are the most out of any Greek club. They have won 36 League titles, a record 24 Cups, a record 5 Super Cups and a record 20 Doubles. They are the dominant force since 1992, having set a number of records including a winning streak of 163 straight wins in both the Greek League's regular season and play-offs, which lasted from May 2013 to May 2019. The men's waterpolo department receives great support from the club's large fanbase, as Olympiacos is the most popular sports club in Greece.

Some of the greatest players in the world have played for Olympiacos over the years including: Filip Filipović, Márton Vámos, Maro Joković, Josip Pavić, Giannis Fountoulis, Marko Bijac, Thodoris Chatzitheodorou, Alexandros Papanastasiou, Stelios Argyropoulos, Đuro Radović Andro Bušlje, Petar Trbojević, Paulo Obradović, Slobodan Nikić, Stefan Mitrović, Ivan Buljubašić, Konstantinos Mourikis, Teo Đogaš, Mlađan Janović, Nikola Rađen, Makis Voltirakis, Antonis Vlontakis, Nikos Deligiannis, Thodoris Kalakonas, Themis Chatzis, Giannis Thomakos, Giorgos Psychos, Sakis Platanitis, Dimitris Kravaritis, Dimitris Skoumpakis, Vangelis Delakas, Manolis Mylonakis, Tasos Schizas, Giorgos Afroudakis, Christos Afroudakis, Giorgos Ntoskas, Kyriakos Giannopoulos, Nikos Venetopoulos, Chris Humbert, Gavin Arroyo, Albert Español, Jesse Smith, Andrija Komadina, Blai Mallarach, Manolis Zerdevas, Christodoulos Kolomvos, Angelos Vlachopoulos, Dimitris Mazis, Alexandros Gounas, Giorgos Dervisis and Konstantinos Genidounias. Such players, under the guidance of world-class coaches like Nikola Stamenić, Zoltán Kásás, Boris Popov, Dragan Matutinović, Mile Nakić, Thodoris Vlachos and Igor Milanović have made Olympiacos one of the most successful teams in European water polo the last 25 years (only Pro Recco, Jug and Posillipo have won more LEN Champions League titles than Olympiacos since 1993).

History

1925–1945: Early years 

Olympiacos men's water polo team was founded in 1925, being one of the first sports departments of Olympiacos CFP that was founded right after the Football team (along with the Athletics and Swimming departments).

In 1927 Olympiacos won the first League title in its history, by defeating Ethnikos Piraeus by a 3–2 scoreline in the final, with players like Nikolaos Kaloudis, Nikolaos Baltatzis - Mavrokordatos, Emmanouil Baltatzis - Mavrokordatos, Ioannis Papadakis, Andreas Athanasianos, Siadimas, Kivotos and Kordopatis.

In 1933 Olympiacos secured their second League title, after a 4–2 win against Ethnikos in the final, with players such as Andreas Kourachanis (goalkeeper), Nikolaos Baltatzis - Mavrokordatos, Takis Provatopoulos, Ioannis Papadakis, Ioannis Isigonis, Andreas Athanasianos and Kivotos. Provatopoulos scored 3 goals and Athanasianos one.

The next season the Red-Whites won a back-to-back League title, by defeating Ethnikos once again with the same 4–2 scoreline in the final. The goals were scored by Provatopoulos (2 goals), Leonidas Alexiou and Isigonis.

In 1936 the team secured their fourth Greek Water Polo League title, this time by defeating K.O. Piraeus with 5–1 in the final.

On 28 October 1940, Fascist Italy invaded Greece, and several Olympiacos players joined the Hellenic Armed Forces to fight against the Axis invaders in World War II. Olympiacos water polo goalkeeper and swimming champion Andreas Kourachanis, was killed in a battle against the Italians. Hellenic Navy Ensign Takis Kontaratos, who was both an Olympiacos water polo player and a midfielder of Olympiacos F.C. as well, was one of the 72 Greek soldiers who were killed in the sinking of Greek destroyer Vasilissa Olga by Junkers Ju 88 bombers of LG 1 of Nazi Germany's Luftwaffe in Lakki harbor of Leros on the morning of 26 September 1943.

1946–1992 

After the war, Olympiacos created a very strong team that won 4 Greek League titles from 1947 to 1952 (1947, 1949, 1951, 1952). The 1949 title was won by players like Takis Provatopoulos, Alekos Monastiriotis, Manolis Papadopoulos, Leonidas Alexiou, Christos Oikonomou, Asimakis, Kleoudis, Maragoudakis, Dimitropoulos and Chalas, after a 3–1 win against Ethnikos Piraeus. In 1951 under the guidance of coach Christos Svolopoulos and players like Takis Provatopoulos, Alekos Monastiriotis, Manolis Papadopoulos, Nikos Teleionis, Babis Gerakarakis, Vasilis Ontrias and Asimakis secured the Greek League title after a 6–2 against N.O Mitilinis in the final. The next season, they won their 4th title in 6 years with key players such as Alekos Monastiriotis, Leonidas Alexiou, Nikos Teleionis, Babis Gerakarakis, Nikos Bistis, Vasilis Ontrias and Asimakis.

In 1969, after a 17-year drought, Olympiacos was crowned Greek champions again, under the guidance of coach Makis Charitos and players like Ioannis Palios, Takis Michalos, Periklis Damaskos, Georgios Palikaris, Stathis Sarantos, Vangelis Koskinas, Spyros Tsiminos, Giorgos Venardos, Spyros Ioannidis, Ilias Damaskos and Omiros Polychronopoulos.

In 1971, Olympiacos board hired the world-class head coach Ivo Trumbić (Hall of Fame inductee in 2014), under whose guidance Olympiacos won the League title in 1971, the 10th Greek League title in the club's history, with a roster of solid Greek players like Ioannis Palios, Takis Michalos, Periklis Damaskos, Georgios Palikaris, Stathis Sarantos, Vangelis Koskinas, Giorgos Venardos, Spyros Ioannidis, Sarantis Sarantos, Ilias Damaskos and Omiros Polychronopoulos.

After the 1971 title, Olympiacos created several strong teams in the following years, like the 1979 team coached by Mile Nakić with players like Stathis Sarantos, Spyros Kapralos, Andreas Gounas, Giorgos Venardos, Spyros Tsiminos, Babis Charalambidis, Nikos Beristianos, Christos Daras and Antonis Karavanos. and later on with solid Greek players like Michalis Kouretas, Giorgos Katsoulis, Giannis Ladas, Andreas Miralis, Giorgos Michailidis, Thanasis Katsoulis and Manolis Psarros but nevertheless, the Red-Whites spent twenty-one years without a League title.

1992–2019: The Golden Era

Domestic domination, first European final (1992–1998) 

In 1992 Olympiacos finally returns to the top of Greek water polo in an impressive fashion, winning both the Greek League and the Greek Cup to complete the first Double in its history. Under the guidance of coach Nikos Loukatos and players like Kyriakos Giannopoulos, Nikos Venetopoulos, Antonis Aronis, Thodoris Vlachos, Kostas Loudis, Dimitris Kravaritis, Themis Chatzis, Sakis Platanitis, Charis Pavlidis και Zafeiris Tzinis, Olympiacos clinched their history's eleventh Greek League title and their first ever Greek Cup after a 9–8 win against NO Patras in the final.

The next season Olympiacos hired Boris Popov, one of the world's greatest water polo coaches, who was head coach of the Soviet Union men's national water polo team that remained undefeated from 1980 to 1986 and won the gold medal at the 1980 Olympics and the gold medal at the 1982 World Championship. Under Popov's guidance, the Red-Whites won a second consecutive domestic Double, securing their history's 12th League title, as well as the Greek Cup after an 8–4 win against ANO Glyfada in the final.

The next three seasons (1994–95, 1995–96 and 1996–97), Mile Nakić came back for a third successful stint in Olympiacos and coached the Red-Whites to two consecutive Greek League titles (1994–95, 1995–96), beating Ethnikos Piraeus in 1995 (3–0 wins in the finals) and NO Vouliagmeni in 1996 (2–1 wins in the finals) and one Greek Cup (1996–97), beating NO Patras 9–8 in the Cup final. Key players of this Olympiacos team were Thodoris Chatzitheodorou, Nikos Venetopoulos, Kostas Loudis, Makis Voltirakis, Themis Chatzis, Sakis Platanitis, Thodoris Vlachos, Dimitris Kravaritis and Charis Pavlidis.

In season 1997–98, Nikos Loukatos, the coach of the 1992 Double, was hired as head coach and players like Giannis Thomakos, Antonis Vlontakis and Gavin Arroyo joined the team. Under Loukatos guidance, the Red-Whites won the Greek Cup after a 10–8 win against NO Patras in the final and the Greek Super Cup, beating Vouliagmeni 10−5 in the final. Most importantly, Olympiacos reached a European final for the first time in its history; after an impressive campaign, the team qualified for the LEN Cup Winners' Cup two-legged final, where they played against Ferencváros. Olympiacos won the first leg in Piraeus by 7−6, but lost the second leg 8−6 in Budapest after a thrilling game.

European powerhouse: twice European champions, Super Cup champions, twice Quadruple winners, domestic dynasty (1998–present) 

From 1998 to 2005 Olympiacos won 7 consecutive Greek League titles which is a record for the A1 League, which was established in 1987, and a record as well for the club.

In season 1998–99 Nikola Stamenić, one of the greatest coaches in the history of the sport, became the team's new head coach. Under Stamenić guidance, Yugoslavia men's national water polo team had won the gold medal in both the 1991 World Championship in Perth and the 1991 European Championship in Athens, becoming World and European Champions in the same year. Stamenić imposed strict professional conditions in Olympiacos, establishing a very demanding training program, iron-fisted discipline and meticulous tactical analysis. 

Under Stamenić, Olympiacos players improved significantly in both mental, physical, technical and tactical level, and in two years they managed to win 2 Greek League titles, 1 Greek Super Cup, and reach the final of the LEN Cup Winners' Cup in 1999, where they lost to Mladost, despite coming close to an amazing come-back in the second final leg, where they led the score by 10−2 at some point in the game (10−6 final score). Stamenic became a legend for the club and his contribution to Olympiacos and to Greek water polo in general is considered enormous. His training methods, his tactics and his deep understanding of every aspect of the game of water polo exerted a great influence on this generation of Olympiacos players.

Stamenić left Olympiacos in the summer of 2000 and Dragan Matutinović became the team's new head coach. Olympiacos had a very successful season, winning both the Greek League and the Greek Cup and becoming the first ever Greek club to reach the LEN Champions League final. In the semi-final of the LEN Champions League 2000-01 Final Four in Dubrovnik, they beat Italian powerhouse CN Posillipo with 7–6 and reached the final of the competition. There, they faced home team VK Jug and lost 8–7 after two overtimes in a thrilling game which was marked by a highly controversial decision of referee Boris Margeta. With the score at 5–5, Olympiacos scored a goal with a spectacular backhand shot by Thodoris Chatzitheodorou with only 4 seconds left in the game, a goal that was disallowed by Margeta as a foul.

Despite the great season, Matutinović left the club and Olympiacos board signed the great Hungarian coach Zoltán Kásás to replace him. Under Kásás guidance in 2001–02 Olympiacos had the most successful season in their history. They became the first club ever in water polo history (since the establishment of the modern Champions League format in 1996) to win four out of four competitions in a single year, thus completing the Continental Quadruple, comprising the Triple Crown (LEN Champions League, Greek Championship, Greek Cup) and the LEN Super Cup. They won both the 2002 LEN Champions League and the 2002 LEN Super Cup in Budapest, beating home teams Honvéd and Vasas respectively. Key players of this historical Olympiacos team were Makis Voltirakis, Thodoris Chatzitheodorou, Petar Trbojević, Giannis Thomakos, Themis Chatzis, Antonis Vlontakis, Giorgos Psychos, Thodoris Kalakonas, Nikos Deligiannis, Sakis Platanitis, Dimitris Kravaritis and Arsenis Maroulis.

In season 2002–03 with Kásás as head coach Olympiacos went on to win the Greek League and the Greek Cup and the next two seasons (2003–04 and 2004–05) under Veselin Đuho's guidance the club managed to win 7 consecutive Greek League titles, an all-time record.

From 2006 to 2011 Olympiacos under the guidance of Greek coach Vangelis Pateros, won 5 consecutive domestic Doubles, two of which (Greek Legue and Greek Cup 2009, Greek League and Greek Cup 2010) undefeated and with 31 wins in 31 matches in both seasons, completing 11 Greek League titles in 12 seasons. In European competitions, they reached 2006–07 LEN Euroleague Final Four in Milan, where they lost 10–9 to eventual European Champions Pro Recco in a thrilling semi-final that was decided in the last seconds of the game.

In 2011, Thodoris Vlachos (who had a long and successful career in Olympiacos as a player) became the new head coach of the team. From 2011 to 2019 under the guidance of Vlachos, Olympiacos have won 1 LEN Champions League, 7 Greek League titles, 6 Greek Cups, 1 Greek Super Cup, 1 Continental Quadruple, and 6 domestic Doubles. In 2018, they won the 2017–18 LEN Champions League in Genoa, beating once again a home team in the final, the Italian powerhouse Pro Recco, the most successful club in the competition with 8 titles. Olympiacos dominated the final game and won the title with a 9–7 scoreline against the Italian side inside their home ground. Along with their second LEN Champions League title, they also completed the second Quadruple Crown in their history (LEN Champions League, Greek Championship, Greek Cup, Greek Super Cup). Key players of this Olympiacos team that was crowned European Champion for the second time in the club's history were Josip Pavić, Giannis Fountoulis, Andro Bušlje, Konstantinos Genidounias, Manolis Mylonakis, Paulo Obradović, Konstantinos Mourikis, Vangelis Delakas, Giorgos Dervisis, Alexandros Gounas, Stelios Argyropoulos and Dimitris Nikolaidis. Under Vlachos, Olympiacos have also reached the final of the 2015–16 LEN Champions League in Budapest, where they lost 6–4 to VK Jug, and the final of the 2018–19 LEN Champions League in Hannover, where they lost in the penalty shootout to Ferencváros.

Overall, from 2006–07 through the 2021–22 season, Olympiacos domestically won 14 Doubles (Greek Championship and Greek Cup) in 16 seasons, five of them straight (2007–2011), and six more undefeated and having won every game (without even a single draw) in both the Greek League and the Greek Cup (2008–09, 2009–10, 2013–14, 2014–15, 2015–16, 2017–18). The club also holds many more unique records in the domestic competitions. They have achieved an all-time record of 163 straight wins in both the Greek League's regular season and play-offs, which lasted from May 2013 to May 2019. Additionally, Olympiacos holds the record for the fewest losses (overall), the most goals scored in a season (446 goals in season 2017–18, beating their previous record of 444 goals in season 2015–16), and the fewest goals conceded in a season (100 goals in season 2015–16).

Honours

Domestic competitions
 Greek League
 Winners (36): 1927, 1933, 1934, 1936, 1947, 1949, 1951, 1952, 1969, 1971, 1991–92, 1992–93, 1994–95, 1995–96, 1998–99, 1999–00, 2000–01, 2001–02, 2002–03, 2003–04, 2004–05, 2006–07, 2007–08, 2008–09, 2009–10, 2010–11, 2012–13, 2013–14, 2014–15, 2015–16, 2016–17, 2017–18, 2018–19, 2019–20, 2020–21, 2021–22
 Greek Cup
 Winners (24) (record): 1991–92, 1992–93, 1996–97, 1997–98, 2000–01, 2001–02, 2002–03, 2003–04, 2005–06, 2006–07, 2007–08, 2008–09, 2009–10, 2010–11, 2012–13, 2013–14, 2014–15, 2015–16, 2017–18, 2018–19, 2019–20, 2020–21, 2021–22, 2022–23
 Greek Super Cup
 Winners (5) (record): 1997, 1998, 2018, 2019, 2020

European competitions
 LEN Champions League
 Winners (2): 2001–02, 2017–18
 Runners-up (3): 2000–01, 2015–16, 2018–19
 Final Four (6): 2001, 2002, 2007, 2016, 2018, 2019
 LEN Super Cup
 Winners (1): 2002
 Runners-up (1): 2018
 LEN Cup Winners' Cup (defunct)
 Runners-up (2): 1997–98, 1998–99

Individual club awards
 Quadruple Crown
 Winners (2): 2001–02 (LEN Champions League, LEN Super Cup, Greek League, Greek Cup), 2017–18 (LEN Champions League, Greek League, Greek Cup, Greek Super Cup)
 Double
 Winners (20) (record): 1991–92, 1992–93, 2000–01, 2001–02, 2002–03, 2003–04, 2006–07, 2007–08, 2008–09, 2009–10, 2010–11, 2012–13, 2013–14, 2014–15, 2015–16, 2017–18, 2018–19, 2019–20, 2020–21, 2021–22

International record

The road to two LEN Champions League victories

2001–02 LEN Champions League victory

2017–18 LEN Champions League victory

Supporters 
Olympiacos fans are renowned for their ardent support to the men's water polo team, with the atmosphere at home matches in Papastrateio Hall regarded as raucous and passionate to such an extent that is rarely seen in water polo matches. Papastrateio is widely considered one of the most fearsome and strong home grounds in Europe. Starting from season 2015–16, Olympiacos has won 19 out of their last 20 LEN Champions League home games in Piraeus (losing only to Szolnoki in the 2016–17 season), while their last defeat in the domestic competitions was recorded on 8 May 2013, with the Red-Whites counting more than 5 and a half years with nothing but straight wins at home in both the Greek League and the Greek Cup.

In 2016 Olympiacos fans carried out the largest fan movement in the history of the sport in the European continent, as more than 1000 Olympiacos supporters travelled to Budapest for the 2016 LEN Champions League Final in the Alfréd Hajós Swimming Pool.

The large Alfréd Hajós pool was filled with Olympiacos fans from Greece and many other European cities, who provided a passionate support to the team in both the semi-final and the final game of the competition.

Olympiacos fans have created a very popular chant to describe the atmosphere they usually create in Olympiacos water polo matches in Papastrateio Hall. They sing: "For your glory Legend, we're gonna turn Papastrateio Hall into a madhouse" (Greek: Θρύλε για το δικό σου μεγαλείο, το Παπαστράτειο τρελοκομείο).

Current roster 
2022–23

Notable players

Source:

 Alexandros Papanastasiou
 Giorgos Afroudakis
 Christos Afroudakis
 Stelios Argyropoulos
 Antonis Aronis
 Nikos Beristianos
 Nikos Bistis
 Fotis Blanis
 Babis Charalambidis
 Makis Charitos
 Marios Chatzikiriakakis
 Themis Chatzis
 Thodoris Chatzitheodorou
 Thanasis Chrisospathis
 Ilias Damaskos
 Periklis Damaskos
 Christos Daras
 Vangelis Delakas
 Nikos Deligiannis
 Giorgos Dervisis
 Christos Floros
 Giannis Fountoulis
 Kostas Galanidis
 Stefanos Galanopoulos
 Konstantinos Genidounias
 Kyriakos Giannopoulos
 Alexandros Gounas
 Andreas Gounas
 Kostas Gouvis
 Spyros Ioannidis
 Ioannis Isigonis
 Konstantinos Kakaris
 Thodoris Kalakonas
 Nikos Kaloudis 	
 Marios Kapotsis
 Spyros Kapralos
 Antonis Karavanos
 Giorgos Katsoulis
 Thanasis Katsoulis
 Spyros Kinigalakis
 Giannis Kocheilas 
 Nikitas Kocheilas
 Christodoulos Kolomvos
 Dimitris Konstas
 Vangelis Koskinas
 Andreas Kourachanis
 Michalis Kouretas
 Dimitris Kravaritis
 Giannis Ladas
 Dimitris Lagonikakis
 Kostas Loudis
 Charis Malevitis
 Arsenis Maroulis
 Takis Mathioudakis
 Dimitris Mazis
 Giorgos Michailidis
 Takis Michalos
 Alekos Monastiriotis
 Konstantinos Mourikis
 Dinos Mourtzis
 Babis Moutsatsos
 Manolis Mylonakis
 Dimitris Nikolaidis
 Giorgos Ntoskas
 Christos Oikonomou
 Vasilis Ontrias
 Giorgos Palikaris 
 Giannis Palios
 Manolis Papadopoulos
 Charis Pavlidis
 Sakis Platanitis
 Omiros Polychronopoulos
 Kyriakos Pontikeas
 Manolis Prekas
 Takis Provatopoulos
 Manolis Psarros
 Giorgos Psychos
 Stefanos Santa
 Sarantis Sarantos
 Stathis Sarantos
 Tasos Schizas
 Dimitrios Skoumpakis
 Nikos Telionis
 Giorgos Theodorakopoulos
 Argyris Theodoropoulos
 Giannis Thomakos
 Spyros Tsiminos
 Giorgos Venardos
 Nikos Venetopoulos
 Angelos Vlachopoulos
 Thodoris Vlachos
 Antonis Vlontakis
 Makis Voltirakis
 Emmanouil Zerdevas
 Marko Bijač 
 Ivan Buljubašić
 Andro Bušlje
 Teo Đogaš
 Maro Joković
 Andrija Komadina
 Paulo Obradović
 Josip Pavić
 Antonio Petković
 Tihomil Vranješ
 Thomas Schertwitis
 Tamás Dala
 Márton Vámos
 Mlađan Janović
 Đuro Radović
 Filip Filipović
 Stefan Mitrović
 Slobodan Nikić
 Nikola Rađen
 Petar Trbojević
 Albert Español
 Blai Mallarach
 Gavin Arroyo
 Hannes Daube
 Chris Humbert
 Max Irving
 Jesse Smith

Notable coaches

Statistics

Greek League records

See also
Olympiacos Women's Water Polo Team

References

External links

Official Website 

LEN Euroleague clubs
Water polo clubs in Greece
Water Polo